Daniel Patrick (born September 5, 1938) is a Canadian retired professional hockey player who played 591 games in the Eastern Hockey League with the Washington Presidents, Johnstown Jets and Salem Rebels.

External links
 

1938 births
Living people
Sportspeople from Aurora, Ontario
Ice hockey people from Ontario
Johnstown Jets players
Salem Rebels players
Canadian expatriate ice hockey players in the United States
Canadian ice hockey centres